Nemesis Divina (Latin for 'divine nemesis') is the third studio album by Norwegian black metal band Satyricon. It was released on 22 April 1996, through Moonfog Productions.

The band have described the album as "darker" and "more aggressive" than their previous work.

A fully remastered edition was released in May 2016 to mark the 20th anniversary of the album.

Album art 
The album cover artwork for Nemesis Divina, designed by Halvor Bodin and Stein Løken, has been considered fairly revolutionary by the standards of black metal at the time. The band commented, "The standard, back then, was dodgy amateur photos and miserable looking fonts". Decibel magazine commented that the cover "resembled more a piece out of Dave McKean's workshop than art Xeroxed at dad's office [...] Rich with color and symbolism, the high-end design broke seriously sacred ground".

Track listing 
All songs written by Satyr, except "Du som hater Gud", written by Satyr & Fenriz

Critical reception 

Nemesis Divina is generally considered a classic of the black metal genre. AllMusic wrote, "this sweeping epic work is quintessential black metal". Terrorizer wrote that on Nemesis Divina, "[Satyricon] experienced a near-magical improvement. Songs like leadoff monster 'The Dawn of a New Age', centerpiece 'Mother North' and the title track were stronger than any song in Satyricon's past. Satyr's ever-impressive riff-making/songwriting skills displayed a maturity not found outside, say, fellow sophisticates Emperor".

A music video was released for "Mother North", which was generally uncommon within the black metal scene at the time. The video opens with "Montagues and Capulets". The video briefly appeared in the mainstream film Spun.

In 2009, IGN included Nemesis Divina in their "10 Great Black Metal Albums" list. Decibel magazine inducted Nemesis Divina into the publication's "hall of fame".

Personnel 
 Satyricon
 Satyr (Sigurd Wongraven) – vocals, lead guitar, bass guitar, sleeve design and logo
 Kveldulv (Ted Skjellum; also known as Nocturno Culto) – rhythm guitar
 Frost (Kjetil-Vidar Haraldstad) – drums, album logo

 Session musicians
 Gerlioz (Geir Bratland) – synthesizer, grand piano
 Nebelhexë (Andrea Haugen) – spoken part on "The Dawn of a New Age"

 Production
 Union of Lost Souls – sleeve design
 Per Heimly Productions – sleeve photography
 Anne Cecilie – makeup for sleeve photos
 Union of Lost Souls – album logo

Charts

References

External links 
 

Satyricon (band) albums
1996 albums